This is a list of diplomatic missions in Guatemala. There are currently 37 embassies in Guatemala City.

Diplomatic missions in Guatemala City

Embassies

Other missions/delegations
 (Embassy Office)
 (Delegation)

Consular missions

Flores (Petén)

Quetzaltenango

Ayutla (Tecún Umán)

Non-resident embassies accredited to Guatemala

Resident in Havana, Cuba:

 
 
 

 

 
 
 
 

Resident in Mexico City, Mexico:

 
 
 

 

 

 

 

 

  
 

 

 

Resident in Washington, D.C., United States of America

 

 
 
 

 
 

 

 
 
 
 

 

 

Resident in New York City, United States of America

 

 
 

 
 

 
 

 

 

 
 

Resident in other cities:

 (Panama City)
 (Panama City)
 (Reykjavik)
 (Managua)
 (San Salvador) 
 (San José)

Former embassies 
 
  (Closed in 2016)

See also
 Foreign relations of Guatemala
 Visa requirements for Guatemalan citizens

Notes

References

 Ministry of Foreign Affairs of Guatemala (Spanish)

 
Diplomatic missions
Guatemala